The 69th British Academy Film Awards, more commonly known as the BAFTAs, were held on 14 February 2016 at the Royal Opera House in London, honouring the best national and foreign films of 2015. Presented by the British Academy of Film and Television Arts, accolades were handed out for the best feature-length film and documentaries of any nationality that were screened at British cinemas in 2015.

The nominations were announced on 8 January 2016 by Stephen Fry and actress Gugu Mbatha-Raw. Bridge of Spies and Carol received the most nominations at nine each. Despite leading the field in nominations, Carol failed to win any awards and Bridge of Spies won just one; Mark Rylance for Best Supporting Actor.

The Revenant won the most awards at the ceremony with five, including Best Film, Best Director for Alejandro G. Iñárritu, Best Actor for Leonardo DiCaprio, and Best Cinematography for Emmanuel Lubezki. Brie Larson won Best Actress for Room and Kate Winslet won Best Supporting Actress for Steve Jobs. Mad Max: Fury Road won four awards; Best Costume Design, Best Editing, Best Makeup and Hair, and Best Production Design. Brooklyn, directed by John Crowley, was voted Outstanding British Film of 2015. Sidney Poitier was awarded the BAFTA Fellowship for his contribution to cinema.

The ceremony was broadcast on BBC One and was watched by 4.5 million viewers, down from 4.9 million in 2015 and the lowest television audience since 2010.

Winners and nominees

The nominees were announced on 8 January 2016. The winners were announced on 14 February 2016.

BAFTA Fellowship
 Sidney Poitier

Outstanding British Contribution to Cinema
 Angels Costumes

Statistics

Ceremony information
The ceremony was broadcast on BBC One at 9 p.m. GMT, around two hours later than the actual ceremony. For the eleventh time, Stephen Fry acted as the host. The ceremony commenced with a segment commemorating the year in film, which was accompanied by the song "Heroes" by David Bowie, who had died the previous month. Highlighting that the ceremony was being held on Valentine's Day, the ceremony showed a kiss cam where random celebrities such as Dame Maggie Smith and Leonardo DiCaprio were persuaded by Fry to kiss each other. Fry also received a number of negative comments after he said of Best Costume Design winner Jenny Beavan (Mad Max: Fury Road) as "Only one of the great cinematic costume designers would come to an awards ceremony dressed as a bag lady". He subsequently deleted his Twitter account following criticism of his joke.

A number of presenters referred to the lack of diversity at the Academy Awards. Rebel Wilson and Sacha Baron Cohen both made jokes referring to the controversy. Sidney Poitier was not present to collect his fellowship due to ill health. Jamie Foxx and Poitier's daughter, Sydney Tamiia Poitier, presented the award to him in person at his home in Los Angeles. Noel Clarke, Lulu, and Oprah Winfrey paid tribute to him in a filmed segment.

The In Memoriam section featured Alan Rickman, Melissa Mathison, Andrew Lesnie, Maureen O'Hara, Gayle Griffiths, Haskell Wexler, Colin Welland, James Horner, David Bowie, Ron Moody, June Randall, Julie Harris, Frank Finlay, Philip French, Vilmos Zsigmond, Albert Maysles, Richard Johnson, Wes Craven, Jacques Rivette, Penelope Houston, Tommie Manderson, Christopher Wood, Saeed Jaffrey, Sheila Sim, and Sir Christopher Lee.

In Memoriam

Alan Rickman
Melissa Mathison
Andrew Lesnie
Maureen O'Hara
Omar Sharif
Gayle Griffiths
Haskell Wexler
Colin Welland
James Horner
David Bowie
Ron Moody
June Randall
Julie Harris
Frank Finlay
Philip French
Vilmos Zsigmond
Albert Maysles
Richard Johnson
Wes Craven
Jacques Rivette
Penelope Houston
Tommie Manderson
Christopher Wood
Saeed Jaffrey
Sheila Sim
Christopher Lee

See also
 5th AACTA International Awards
 88th Academy Awards
 41st César Awards
 21st Critics' Choice Awards
 68th Directors Guild of America Awards
 29th European Film Awards
 73rd Golden Globe Awards
 36th Golden Raspberry Awards
 30th Goya Awards
 31st Independent Spirit Awards
 21st Lumières Awards
 6th Magritte Awards
 3rd Platino Awards
 27th Producers Guild of America Awards
 20th Satellite Awards
 42nd Saturn Awards
 22nd Screen Actors Guild Awards
 68th Writers Guild of America Awards

References

External links
 

2015 film awards
2016 in British cinema
2016 in London
Film069
Royal Opera House
February 2016 events in the United Kingdom
2015 awards in the United Kingdom